The New Zealand national football team represent New Zealand in international association football competitions.

New Zealand national football team may also refer to:

New Zealand national American football team
New Zealand national Australian rules football team
New Zealand national beach soccer team
New Zealand women's national football team

See also
New Zealand national rugby team (disambiguation)